Ποιος θέλει να γίνει εκατομμυριούχος (English translation: Who wants to become a millionaire?, transliteration: Poios thelei na ginei ekatommyriouchos) is a game show based on the British Who Wants to be a Millionaire? format debuted in 1999 on Mega Channel. The player had to answer 15 questions correctly in order to win ₯50 million up to 2001, €150,000 up to 2004, and €250,000 in 2006. In 2010, the show was chosen as the most popular game show in 20 years of Mega Channel program. From 1999 to 2004 the show was hosted by Spiros Papadopoulos, and in 2006 - by Thodoris Atheridis. There were three lifelines - fifty-fifty (50:50), phone a friend and ask the audience, but in 2006, the "switch the question" lifeline was added, but if a contestant wanted to use it, he had to give up one of his other lifelines. The show was broadcast from 1999 to 2002 on Mega Channel, from 2002 to 2004 on the ERT channels and in 2006 on Alpha TV.

The show was revived in April 2022 on ANT1 with Grigoris Arnaoutoglou as host. The program can be also watched in Cyprus on ANT1 Cyprus.

Payout structure

Season overview

Winners of the grand prizes
There were two winners.

Giorgos Georgopoulos (October 2, 2001)
Giorgos Georgopoulos (Γιώργος Γεωργόπουλος) won ₯50 million by correctly answering the question:

Stelios Stergiou (November 21, 2003)
Stelios Stergiou (Στέλιος Στεργίου) won €150,000 by correctly answering the question:

Losers of the grand prizes 

Only one contestant has reached the final question and answered it incorrectly.

Michalis Mavrogenis (January 30, 2001) 
Michalis Mavrogenis (Μιχάλης Μαυρογένης) lost ₯22 million and won ₯2 million by incorrectly answering the question:

References 

Who Wants to Be a Millionaire?
Mega Channel original programming
Hellenic Broadcasting Corporation original programming
Alpha TV original programming
1999 Greek television series debuts
2006 Greek television series endings
1990s Greek television series
2000s Greek television series
Greek game shows
Greek-language television shows